Split Rock, also known as Twin Peaks, is a mountain in the Granite Mountains of central Wyoming. The mountain is distinctive for a deep V-shaped cleft dividing its summit. The mountain was a prominent landmark on the Oregon Trail and other early settlement routes in the region, which crossed a low rise at the eastern end of the range between Casper and the North Platte River valley and the Sweetwater River.

The mountain summit was listed on the National Register of Historic Places in 1976 for its historic significance.

Geology
Fifty million years ago the Sweetwater River Valley and the Granite Range began to form. The range was created as a segment of the Rocky Mountains. Then, fifteen million years ago the area dropped downward creating a bowl. As the area continued downward, ‘Moonstone Lake’ formed about ten million years ago. It as large, shallow, and briny, adding an additional  of sediments, with some uranium concentrations. The erosion, stripped the surrounding high points, exposing the Granite Range.

The Continental Divide follows the southern rim of the basin, encompassing the Wind River and Sweetwater Valleys, following the crest of the Wind River Range, with the eastward extension including (east to west) the Ferris Mountains, Green Mountains, Crooks Mountain and the Antelope Hills. There are a few breaks in this range of mountains, i.e., Muddy Gap, Crooks Gap and the broad slope called South Pass. This extended valley is a natural ramp built from the sands of ancient Moonstone Lake. The Sweetwater serpentine s through the eastern basin as a clear mountain stream.  It has easy slopes, fresh water, and abundant grass. By pack train, wagon or handcart traveled the nineteenth century emigrant, seeking as direct a route as possible through the Great Plains and Rocky Mountains. The Sweetwater segment begins near the Alcova Reservoir, leaving the valley of the North Platte River.  After  it exits through South Pass.

History
The Sweetwater River Valley is a break in the Rocky Mountain chain. It thus provides a major, east-west overland route through the Rocky Mountains. This route was used by fur trappers, goldseekers, homeseekers, merchants and troopers.  They rode horseback, in wagons, walked, or pulled and pushed handcarts from 1812 to 1912.

Beginning with the Astorians under Robert Stuart seeking a route to the mouth of the Columbia River for furs. Through the California Trail, the Oregon Trail, and the Mormon Pioneer Trail. Before 1812, portions of the trail were used by High Plains American Indians following migratory herds of buffalo or other game animals.  By 1912 the railroads, then the automobile and airplane replaced the wagon trail.

See also
National Register of Historic Places listings in Natrona County, Wyoming

References

Natural features on the National Register of Historic Places in Wyoming
Mountains of Natrona County, Wyoming